The men's 200 metres event at the 1983 Summer Universiade was held at the Commonwealth Stadium in Edmonton, Canada on 8, 9 and 10 July 1983.

Medalists

Results

Heats
Held on 8 July

Wind:Heat 1: ? m/s, Heat 2: +1.0 m/s, Heat 3: ? m/s, Heat 4: +3.0 m/s, Heat 5: ? m/s

Quarterfinals
Held on 9 July

Wind:Heat 1: +0.5 m/s, Heat 2: +1.5 m/s, Heat 3: +0.7 m/s

Semifinals
Held on 10 July

Wind:Heat 1: +0.1 m/s, Heat 2: -0.5 m/s

Final
Held on 10 July

Wind: +0.6 m/s

References

Athletics at the 1983 Summer Universiade
1983